Mule Island is a small island lying immediately southwest of Hawker Island, off the west tip of Mule Peninsula, Vestfold Hills, in Prydz Bay, Antarctica. It was mapped by Norwegian cartographers from air photos taken by the Lars Christensen Expedition (1936–37) and named "Muloy" (snout island).

See also 
 List of antarctic and sub-antarctic islands

Islands of Princess Elizabeth Land